Frans van Mieris, the younger (24 November 168922 October 1763) was a Dutch painter.

He was born in Leiden, the son of Willem van Mieris, and also followed the traditions of his grandfather, Frans's studio.

Willem bequeathed his painting room to his son Frans. Neither Willem nor Frans the younger equalled Frans the elder in artistic reputation.  Frans died in Leiden.

Works

Paintings
Rev. dr. Cox Macro (1703–1715)
Flower (1720)
Old Peasant Holding a Jug (1731)
Old Man With the Book
Three Generations (1742)
Portrait of Pieter de la Court (1750)
Portrait of Andreas Weiss (1752)

Engravings
Gerard van Loon (c. 1704–1763)

External links

References

1689 births
1763 deaths
18th-century Dutch painters
18th-century Dutch male artists
Dutch male painters
Artists from Leiden